Tomáš Slavík (born 29 April 1981 in Jilemnice) is a Czech nordic combined skier who has competed since 2002. Competing in two Winter Olympics, he earned his best finish of eighth twice (4 x 5 km team: 2006, 2010) while earning his best individual finish of 20th in the 10 km individual normal hill event at Vancouver in 2010.

Slavík's best finish at the FIS Nordic World Ski Championships was sixth in the 4 x 5 km team event at Liberec in 2009 while his best individual finish was 27th twice (7.5 km sprint: 2007, 15 km individual: 2005).

His best World Cup finish was fifth in a 10 km individual large hill event at Germany in 2009.

References

Profile at Sports-Reference.com

1981 births
Czech male Nordic combined skiers
Living people
Nordic combined skiers at the 2006 Winter Olympics
Nordic combined skiers at the 2010 Winter Olympics
Nordic combined skiers at the 2014 Winter Olympics
Olympic Nordic combined skiers of the Czech Republic
Universiade medalists in nordic combined
People from Jilemnice
Universiade bronze medalists for the Czech Republic
Competitors at the 2003 Winter Universiade
Competitors at the 2007 Winter Universiade
Sportspeople from the Liberec Region